The Granite City Railway was a street railway that ran in St. Cloud and Sauk Rapids, Minnesota.

External links

 Saint Cloud transit history

Defunct Minnesota railroads
Defunct town tramway systems by city